Cessna Aircraft Field  is a public use airport located four nautical miles (7 km) southeast of the central business district of Wichita, in Sedgwick County, Kansas, United States. It is privately owned by the Cessna Aircraft Company.

Facilities and aircraft 
It has one runway designated 17/35 with an asphalt measuring 3,873 by 40 feet (1,180 x 12 m).

For the 12-month period ending May 13, 2008, the airport had 100 general aviation aircraft operations, an average of 8 per month. At that time there were 16 aircraft based at this airport: 94% single-engine and 6% multi-engine.

Nearby airports

Other airports in Wichita
 Wichita Dwight D. Eisenhower National Airport
 Colonel James Jabara Airport
 Beech Factory Airport
 McConnell Air Force Base
 Westport Airport

Other airports in metro
 El Dorado/Captain Jack Thomas Memorial Airport
 Augusta Municipal Airport
 Lloyd Stearman Field (Benton)
Other airports in region
 List of airports in Kansas
 List of airports in Oklahoma

References

External links 
 Cessna Aircraft Company
 Aerial photo as of 20 March 1996 from USGS The National Map
 
 

Airports in Kansas
Buildings and structures in Wichita, Kansas
Transportation in Wichita, Kansas
Cessna
Privately owned airports